The Roman Catholic Archdiocese of Sucre is an archdiocese located in the city of Sucre in Bolivia.

History
 June 27, 1552: Established as Diocese of La Plata or Charcas from the Diocese of Cusco in Peru
 July 20, 1609: Promoted as Metropolitan Archdiocese of La Plata or Charcas
 November 11, 1924: Renamed as Metropolitan Archdiocese of Sucre

Special churches
Minor Basilicas:
Catedral Basílica de Nuestra Señora de Guadalupe
Basilica de San Francisco in Sucre

Ordinaries

Diocese of La Plata or Charcas
Tomás de San Martín, O.P. (1552–1559 Died)
Fernando González de la Cuesta (1561–1561 Died)
Domingo de Santo Tomás, O.P. (1562–1570 Died)
Fernando Santillana Figueroa (1572–1574 Died)
Alfonso Graniero Avalos (1579–1585 Died)
Alfonso de la Cerda, O.P. (1587–1592 Died)
Alonso Ramírez Vergara, O.S. (1594–1602 Died)
Luis López de Solís, O.S.A. (1605–1606 Died) 
Diego de Zambrana (de Carmona) (1608–1609 Died before he was consecrated)

Archdiocese of La Plata or Charcas
Alonso de Peralta (1609–1614 Died)
Jerónimo Tiedra Méndez, O.P. (1616–1623 Died)
Hernando de Arias y Ugarte (1624–1628 Confirmed, Archbishop of Lima)
Francisco Sotomayor, O.F.M. (1628–1630 Died)
Francisco Vega Borja, O.S.B. (1635–1644 Died)
Pedro de Oviedo Falconi, O. Cist. (1645–1649 Died)
Juan Alonso y Ocón (1651–1656 Died)
Gaspar de Villarroel, O.S.A. (1659–1665 Died)
Bernardo de Izaguirre de los Reyes (1669–1670 Died)
Melchor de Liñán y Cisneros (1672–1677 Appointed, Archbishop of Lima)
Cristóbal de Castilla y Zamora (1677–1683 Died)
Bartolomé González y Poveda (1685–1692 Died)
Juan Queipo de Llano y Valdés (archbishop) (1694–1713 Died)
Diego Morcillo Rubio de Suñón de Robledo, O.SS.T. (1714–1723 Appointed, Archbishop of Lima)
Juan de Necolalde (1723–1724 Died)
Luis Francisco Romero (1725–1728 Died)
Alonso del Pozo y Silva (1730–1742 Resigned)
Agustín Rodríguez Delgado (1742–1746 Confirmed, Archbishop of Lima)
Salvador Bermúdez y Becerra (1746–1746 Died)
Gregorio de Molleda y Clerque (1747–1756 Died)
Bernardo de Arbizu y Ugarte (Appointed 23 May 1757–Did Not Take Effect)
Cayetano Marcellano y Agramont (1758–1760 Died)
Pedro Miguel Argandoña Pastene Salazar (1762–1775 Died)
Francisco Ramón Herboso y Figueroa, O.P. (1776–1782 Died)
José Campos Julián, O.C.D. (1789–1804 Died)
Benito María de Moxó y Francolí, O.S.B. (1805–1816 Died)
Diego Antonio Navarro Martín de Villodras (1818–1827 Died)
José María Mendizábal (1835– 1846 Died)
Manuel Ángel del Prado Cárdenas (1855–1858 Died)
Pedro Jose Puch y Solona (1861–1885 Died)
Pedro José Cayetano de la Llosa, C.O. (1887–1897 Died)
Miguel de los Santos Taborga (1898–1905 Died)
Sebastiano Francisco Pifferi, O.F.M. (1906–1912 Died)
Victor Arrién (Arrieu) (1914–1922 Resigned)

Archdiocese of Sucre
Luigi Francesco Pierini, O.F.M. (1923–1939 Died)
Daniel Rivero Rivero (1940–1951 Retired)
José Clemente Maurer, C.SS.R. (1951–1983 Retired) (Cardinal in 1967)
René Fernández Apaza (1983–1988 Appointed, Archbishop of Cochabamba)
Jesús Gervasio Pérez Rodríguez, O.F.M. (1989–2013 Retired)
Jesús Juárez Párraga, S.D.B. (2 Feb 2013 Appointed – 11 Feb 2020 Retired)
Ricardo Ernesto Centellas Guzmán (11 Feb 2020 Appointed – )

Other affiliated bishops

Coadjutor archbishop
René Fernández Apaza (1981–1983)

Auxiliary bishops
Rafael Andreu Guerrero (1804-1819)
Matías Terrazas (1827); did not take effect
Sebastiano Francisco Pifferi, O.F.M. (1905-1906), appointed Archbishop here
Juan Tarcisio Senner, O.F.M. (1948-1951), appointed Bishop of Cochabamba
Augustin Arce Mostajo (1958-1984)
Alfonso Nava Carreón (1969-1984)
Alejandro Mestre Descals, S.J. (1976-1982), appointed Coadjutor Archbishop of La Paz
Jesús Gervasio Pérez Rodríguez, O.F.M.  (1985-1989), appointed Archbishop here
Walter Pérez Villamonte (1995-1998), appointed Bishop of Potosí
Adolfo Eduardo José Bittschi Mayer (2008–present)

Other priests of this diocese who became bishops
Juan Bravo del Rivero y Correa, appointed Bishop of Santiago de Chile in 1734
Dionisio Ávila, appointed Bishop of La Paz in 1916
Ricardo Ernesto Centellas Guzmán, appointed Auxiliary Bishop of Potosí in 2005
Percy Lorenzo Galvan Flores, appointed Prelate of Corocoro in 2013

Suffragan dioceses
Diocese of Potosí
Diocese of Tarija

See also
Roman Catholicism in Bolivia

References

External links
 GCatholic.org

Roman Catholic dioceses in Bolivia
Religious organizations established in the 1550s
1552 establishments in the Spanish Empire
Roman Catholic dioceses established in the 16th century
 
Roman Catholic ecclesiastical provinces in Bolivia